Jean-Marie Teno (born 1954) is a Cameroonian film director and filmmaker, "one of Africa's most prolific filmmakers".

Life
Teno was born in 1954 in Famleng in Bandjoun. He studied audiovisual communication at the University of Valenciennes and worked as a film critic for Bwana Magazine and as editor-in-chief at France 3. In 1983, he directed his first short documentary Schubbah. In 1992 he made his documentary Africa, I will pluck you on the effects of colonialism and neocolonialism in Cameroon. In 1996, he made Clando, which won the Audience Award at the 6th African Film Festival in Milan, Italy.

Jean-Marie Teno is also a producer of his own films with Les Films du Raphia. In 2007-2008, he was a Visiting Artist at Copeland Fellow at Amherst College, and in 2009-2010 he was Visiting Professor at Hampshire College, Massachusetts.

He lives between France, Cameroon and the United States.

Filmography
 1983 : Schubbah (short film)
 1985 : Tribute (short film)
 1985 : Yellow Fever taximan (short film)
 1987 : The Slap and the Caress (short film)
 1988 : The Misery Water (documentary)
 1990 : The Last Voyage (short film)
 1991 : Mister Foot (documentary)
 1992 : Africa, I'll pluck you... (documentary)
 1996 : The Head in the Clouds (short film)
 1996 : Clando (feature film)
 1999 : Chef!  (documentary)
 2000 : Holidays at home (documentary)
 2002 : The Marriage of Alex (documentary)
 2004 : The colonial misunderstanding (documentary)
 2009 : Holy Places (documentary)
 2013 : A Leaf in the Wind (documentary)

Awards 
 Clando
 1996: Prize of the International Federation of Film Crews at the Friborg International Film Festival (Switzerland);  Audience Award at the Milan African Film Festival (Italy);  Grand Prize at the Vues d'Afrique Festival of Montreal;  Human Rights Award at Montreal's Vues d'Afrique Festival

Head in the clouds
 1994: OAU Jury Prize at the Carthage Film Days
 1995: IUCN Prize and African Insurers Award at FESPACO;  Documentary Award at the Festival Vues d'Afrique de Montréal

Africa, I'll pluck you ...
 1992: Documentary Award at the Troia Festival;  OCIC Jury Prize at the Carthage Film Days;  Prize for Solidarity in the world at Carthage Film Days.

Water of misery
 1989: TV5-Europe Prize at Écovision in Lille;  Honorable Mention at the Troia Festival (Portugal)

Yellow fever taximan
1986: Special mention at the Clermont-Ferrand Festival

References

External links
 
 Horst Rutsch, Interview with Jean-Marie Teno, African Film Festival, Inc., 23 April 2005
 Jean-Marie Teno, Writing on Walls: Documentary, the future of African cinema?, Africultures, 20 March 2011

1954 births
Living people
Cameroonian film directors
Cameroonian film producers